Emmanuel "Manny" Williams (born 13 November 1981) is a Sierra Leonean footballer who lastly was player/assistant manager at Slough Town. He plays as a forward. He has been capped once by the Sierra Leone national football team.

Career

Club career
Williams played for Notts County and Millwall early in his career, though he did not make any senior appearances for either side. He then dropped into the Essex Senior Football League, playing for Concord Rangers and Bowers United, before progressing to the Isthmian League with Leyton. In 2005 he moved up to the Conference South with Yeading, but stepped back down a level to return to Leyton the following season.

A year later, he stepped up to the second tier of non-league football again to play for Maidenhead United. After 24 league goals in the 2007–08 season, and 30 goals in all competitions, winning the Players' and Supporters' Player of the Year awards, he joined Conference National side Woking. However, he failed to score in twelve league games, and returned to Maidenhead and then Weston-super-Mare on loan.

Williams joined Havant & Waterlooville in summer 2009. He scored 31 league goals across two seasons before joining Maidenhead for a third time. The following season he joined Hayes & Yeading United, but left for Basingstoke Town in November. He stayed there until the end of the 2015–16 season, scoring 37 goals in 116 league games.

He had brief spells with Hampton & Richmond Borough and Hungerford Town, before joining Slough Town on loan from the latter in January 2017. He joined Slough permanently that summer. He scored 10 league goals for the Rebels that season, and came off the bench to score the winner in the Southern Football League play-off final against Kings Lynn Town.

By now in his late 30s, Williams made a diminishing number of appearances for Slough following promotion to the National League South, and had loan spells with Basingstoke, Beaconsfield Town, Harrow Borough and Staines Town while continuing to remain an important squad player for the Rebels.

Williams joined Hellenic Football League side Burnham as player-assistant manager for the 2020-21 season. Williams became player-manager in October 2021. He returned to Slough in January 2022 as player-assistant manager after leaving Burnham by mutual consent.

International career
Born in Sierra Leone but raised in London, Williams was capped by England Schoolboys as a youngster. He made his only appearance for the Sierra Leone national football team in February 2012, as a substitute against São Tomé and Príncipe in 2013 Africa Cup of Nations qualification.

References

External links

Manny Williams at Aylesbury United

1981 births
Living people
English footballers
Sierra Leonean footballers
Sierra Leone international footballers
Association football forwards
Notts County F.C. players
Millwall F.C. players
Concord Rangers F.C. players
Bowers & Pitsea F.C. players
Leyton F.C. players
Yeading F.C. players
Maidenhead United F.C. players
Woking F.C. players
Weston-super-Mare A.F.C. players
Havant & Waterlooville F.C. players
Hayes & Yeading United F.C. players
Basingstoke Town F.C. players
Hampton & Richmond Borough F.C. players
Hungerford Town F.C. players
Slough Town F.C. players
Beaconsfield Town F.C. players
Harrow Borough F.C. players
Staines Town F.C. players
Burnham F.C. players
National League (English football) players
Isthmian League players
Southern Football League players